Agnes Monica Muljoto (born 1 July 1986), known professionally as Agnez Mo (stylized as all caps), is an Indonesian diva singer, songwriter, dancer, and actress. She was professionally known as Agnes Monica before amending her stage name.  As a bilingual singer who records in Indonesian and English, she is known for her image reinventions and musical versatility throughout her career.

Prior to recording three children's albums and presenting several children's television programs, Agnes Monica began as a worship singer at a church in Jakarta, Indonesia. She released her first teen album entitled And the Story Goes in 2003, which catapulted her name in Indonesian music industry. Her success in her homeland encouraged her to target the international music industry. She has since collaborated with American musicians, such as Timbaland, Michael Bolton, Keith Martin, T.I., Chris Brown, French Montana, and Steve Aoki.

Mo is the most awarded artist in the history of Indonesia with over 190 awards, including 18 Anugerah Musik Indonesia, 8 Panasonic Awards, 5 Nickelodeon Indonesia Kids’ Choice Awards, 4 MTV Indonesia Awards, 2 Mnet Asian Music Awards, 1 World Music Awards, and 1 iHeartRadio Music Awards. Mo is an anti-drug ambassador in Asia and the ambassador of MTV EXIT in combating human trafficking. Mo has also claimed the title of entrepreneur, showcasing her own fashion line ANYE, APP, Digital Marketplace, and partnering with cell phone manufacturer Vivo to create her own limited-edition line of devices. Mo will be immortalized through a wax statue at the Madame Tussauds Museum in Singapore, and thus becoming the first Indonesian celebrity to have a wax statue made there.

Life and career

Childhood and early career
Agnes Monica Muljoto was born in Jakarta, Indonesia, to a family of Chinese ancestry. She is the youngest child of Jenny Siswono, a former table tennis player, and Ricky Muljoto, a former basketball player. Her elder brother, Steve Muljoto, is her manager. She attended Tarakanita elementary school and Pelita Harapan Junior and Senior High school in Jakarta. She has shown her talent in the performing arts since childhood, especially in singing. She sang in church and was also sent to vocal courses.

Using "Agnes Monica" as her stage name, Agnes entered the entertainment industry in 1992 with her first children's album, . In 1995, she released her second children's album, Yess!, which includes a duet with fellow Indonesian child singer Eza Yayang. Her last children's album, was released the following year. She also became the host for several children's programs, including Video Anak Anteve (VAN) on ANTV, Tralala-Trilili on RCTI, and Diva Romeo on Trans TV. She was awarded "Most Favorite Presenter of Children's Program" at the Panasonic Awards in 1999 and 2000 for Tralala-Trilili.

Agnes began acting when she was 13 years old. The next year, she starred in the TV series Pernikahan Dini, which served as a turning point in her career by transforming her image from that of a child artist to one of a teenage artist. In 2002, Mo starred in three soap operas: Ciuman Pertama, Kejar Daku Kau Ku Tangkap, and Amanda. Due to her popularity, she became the highest-paid teenage artist in Indonesia.

Agnes returned to the music industry with the Melly Goeslaw-penned songs "Pernikahan Dini" and "Seputih Hati" for the soundtrack of Pernikahan Dini. Both songs were featured on the 2001 compilation album, . She also collaborated with the Indonesian senior singer Yana Julio in the song "Awan dan Ombak" for his 2002 studio album, Jumpa Lagi.

2003–2006: And The Story Goes, TV series, and Whaddup A.. '?!

On 8 October 2003, Agnes released her first studio album as an adult, And the Story Goes, in which she worked with several prominent Indonesian producers and songwriters, including Ahmad Dhani, Melly Goeslaw, and Titi DJ. The album production took a year and a half, including the audition process for the dancers. According to her record label, the album sold 35,000 copies before its official release. It was later certified double platinum after selling more than 300,000 copies. Four singles were released from the album: "Bilang Saja", "Indah", "Jera" and "Cinta Mati" (featuring Ahmad Dhani). The album received ten nominations at the 2004 Anugerah Musik Indonesia. Agnes won three awards for Best Pop Female Solo Artist, Best Dance/Techno Production Work, and Best Pop Duo/Group for her duet with Dhani. She also won Best Female Newcomer Artist at the 2004 Anugerah Planet Muzik in Singapore

While promoting her debut album, Agnes also starred in several TV series, playing the lead role in three of them: Cewekku Jutek, and Cantik.

Agnes launched her second studio album, Whaddup A.. '?!, on 7 November 2005. It featured five singles: "Bukan Milikmu Lagi", "Tanpa Kekasihku", "Tak Ada Logika", "Cinta Di Ujung Jalan", and "Tak Mungkin". In addition to working with prominent Indonesian musicians such as Melly Goeslaw, Andi Rianto, and Erwin Gutawa, she also collaborated with American singer-songwriter Keith Martin. Martin wrote two English songs for the album, including the duet "I'll Light a Candle". To promote the album, she held a concert tour known as Clasnezenzation in four Indonesian cities.

The album was a commercial success, and Agnes won two 2006 Anugerah Musik Indonesia for Best Pop Female Solo Artist and Best R&B Production Work. She also won the Most Favorite Female award at the 2006 MTV Indonesia Awards. Agnes was nominated for Favorite Artist Indonesia award at the 2005 MTV Asia Awards. She was the youngest artist of all nominees in Asian category. Selling more than 450,000 copies, the album was one of the top-selling albums of 2006 and was certified triple platinum.

In 2005, Agnes appeared in the Taiwanese drama The Hospital, co-starring with Jerry Yan, a member of the Taiwanese boyband F4. She also appeared with Peter Ho in several episodes of the Taiwanese drama Romance in the White House, and starred in two TV series,  and Pink. In 2006, she starred in a TV series, . In the same year, she decided to take a break from her study in Pelita Harapan University to focus on her career.

2007–2010: Sacredly Agnezious and Indonesian Idol

In early 2007, Agnes was appointed by the Drug Enforcement Administration (DEA) and the International Drug Enforcement Conference (IDEC) Far East Region as an Asian anti-drug ambassador. On 15 May 2007, Agnes was an opening act for American R&B group Boyz II Men, at a concert in Istora Senayan, Jakarta, and on 23 June of that year, she held her first concert at Stadium Negara in Kuala Lumpur, Malaysia. She also guest starred in the finale of Asian Idol on 16 December 2007, and performed the song "Get Up".

In 2008, Agnes began working on her third studio album. She released the first single, "Matahariku", earlier than she had planned. It became her best-selling single, with sales of its ringback tone reaching three million downloads within nine months. The song received the "Most Favorite Female" award at the 2008 MTV Indonesia Awards and the "Best Female Solo Pop Artist" award at the 2009 Anugerah Musik Indonesia. In September 2008, Agnes released the second single, "Godai Aku Lagi", which she wrote herself. She also released a CD single containing both of the songs. That same year, she starred in two RCTI soap operas,  and Kawin Masal.

On 4 October 2008, Agnes was invited as the Indonesian representative to the Asia Song Festival in Seoul, South Korea. She performed with 24 artists from 12 Asian countries at the Seoul World Cup Stadium. The event was broadcast to 30 countries. She performed two songs from her upcoming album, "Godai Aku Lagi" and "Shake It Off". During the performance, she incorporated elements of Indonesian traditional dance from Bali. Her performance received positive responses from the Korean media and won the committee's "Best Asian Artist Award". The following year, Agnes was invited again alongside 14 Asian artists and performed three songs: "Shake It Off", "Temperature", and Michael Jackson's song "Heal the World". She received good reviews and was awarded the Best Asian Artist Award.

Agnes launched her third studio album on 1 April 2009, Sacredly Agnezious. This time she was more involved in the production process of the album. She worked with renowned musicians Erwin Gutawa, Dewiq, Pay, and DJ Sumantri and also acted as producer and songwriter. In addition to "Matahariku" and "Godai Aku Lagi", the album yielded two more singles: "Teruskanlah" and "Janji–Janji". Later she won three awards at the 2010 Anugerah Musik Indonesia; Best Pop Album, Best Female Pop Solo Artist, and Best of the Best Album. On 23 May 2009, Agnes appeared as a guest star at the "Festival of Life" in Garuda Wisnu Kencana, Bali, to commemorate the 50-year anniversary of the establishment of diplomatic relations between Indonesia and Japan.

In 2010, Agnes joined the judging panel of the season 6 of Indonesian Idol. That year, she was also appointed as an ambassador of the MTV EXIT (End Exploitation and Trafficking) organization, which combats human trafficking. In addition to her role as a spokesperson of MTV Exit Indonesia, she also performed at concerts in Surabaya and Jakarta. In late 2010, Agnes was chosen as an international red carpet host for the annual American Music Awards On 21 November 2010 at the Nokia Theatre in Los Angeles. Several months after that appearance, she announced that she had signed to Sony/ATV Music Publishing and was working on her international debut in London and Los Angeles.

2011–2014: Agnez Mo
In early 2011, Agnes recorded a duet version of "Said I Loved You...But I Lied" with American singer Michael Bolton, for the Asian edition of his compilation album, Gems: The Duets Album with Bolton only saying that Agnes had potential. Her slogan "Dream, Believe, and Make it Happen" was used in a 2011 cultural conference to inspire young people organized by the US Embassy in Jakarta. She was chosen to perform for the 26th SEA Games 2011 Opening Ceremony, with KC Concepcion from the Philippines and the Malaysian singer, Jaclyn Victor. Their performance of "Together We Will Shine" was the highlight of the event.

Agnes ended her 10-year relationship with label Aquarius Musikindo by releasing her first greatest hits album, Agnes Is My Name, on 2 February 2011. The album compiled ten hit singles of the past decade with two new songs, "Karena Ku Sanggup" and "Paralyzed". The album was sold via Indonesian chains of fast-food restaurant KFC (Kentucky Fried Chicken), where the CD was bundled with chicken package purchase. This marketing strategy boosted the album sales to one million copies within three months, earning her the Million Award. She followed it with two non-album singles, "Rindu" and "Muda (Le O Le O)"; the later was free to download for simPATI subscribers.

Agnes won Anugerah Musik Indonesia for Best Female Pop Artist category for two consecutive years, in 2011 with "Karena Ku Sanggup" and in 2012 with "Paralyzed". She was among the Worldwide Acts Asia Pacific nominees for the 2011 MTV Europe Music Awards. In March 2012, she was nominated for Favorite Asian Act at the 2012 Nickelodeon Kids' Choice Awards. Still in the same year, she won the Mnet Asian Music Awards for Best Asian Artist from Indonesia and the Shorty Awards for The Shorty Vox Populi Award.

Agnes starred in soap operas Pejantan Cantik (2010), Marisa (2011) and Mimo Ketemu Poscha (2012). In 2012, she returned as one of the judges for the season 7 of Indonesian Idol. The next year, she became a judge on NET's talent show named after her, Nez Academy. In December 2012, she gave the opening and closing speeches at UN Global Youth Forum and performed her unreleased song "Show a Little Love" with American rapper Timbaland. They also performed the song at the pre-Grammy launch party in Los Angeles.

On 1 June 2013, Agnes released her fourth studio album, Agnez Mo, which introduced her new stage name instead of 'Agnes Monica'. Produced by Tearce Kizzo, it is her first album where she co-wrote all the songs. The album was originally recorded as her demo which was sent out to record labels in the United States in order to secure a deal for her international debut. Although all songs were composed in English, the album was released for Indonesian market only. It was released digitally via Souniq Music (bundled with local coffee brand, Kopi Kapal Api) in June 2013. Two months later, the album was released physically via Indomaret. She also released her first-ever "eau de perfume" line, Rêve, meaning "Dream" in French.

Mo landed her US record deal with The Cherry Party, a label ventured with Sony Music Entertainment. Her debut international single, "Coke Bottle", featuring Timbaland and T.I., premiered in September 2013 in a hip hop radio station in Los Angeles, Power 106 FM. "Coke Bottle" was released digitally on 8 April 2014, and was serviced to urban radio stations in the United States on 20 April. Despite being voted as MTV Iggy's Song of the Summer, "Coke Bottle" failed to enter any Billboard charts. In November 2014, it was announced that she had joined the Wright Entertainment Group, a management group owned by Johnny Wright who has handled some of the big names in the US entertainment industry. She embarked on the Keep Walking Tour in several cities across Indonesia. The tour was sponsored by whisky brand Johnnie Walker.

2015–present: The Voice Indonesia, X, and international debut
In 2015, Mo produced The Freaks, a singing group which consisted of Indonesian young stars. The album, also titled THE FREAKS, will contain eight group, duo, and solo songs. The first single from their collaboration, "Jatuh Cinta Tak Ada Logika" is a mash-up of two songs, "Ku T'lah Jatuh Cinta" and "Tak Ada Logika". Besides The Freaks, she also produced and wrote a single "Vroom Vroom" for her niece, Chloe X.

In September 2015, together with The Wahid Institute and thousands of prominent figures and supporters, Mo read the Declaration of Peace Movement which titled the 'Oath of Love' as a celebration of International Day of Peace. She released a single, entitled "I #AM Generation of Love", as part of the Oath of Love campaign which premiered on 250 local radio stations, followed by "Boy Magnet" in November 2015. "Boy Magnet" brought Mo entering her first Billboard charts at 52nd in Dance Club Songs.

In 2016, Mo joined the coaching panel of the season 2 of The Voice Indonesia with Kaka, Ari L,asso and Judika. She also joined the coaching panel of The Voice Kids Indonesia with Bebi Romeo and Tulus.

On 22 September 2017, Mo released a single titled "Long As I Get Paid". She released her debut international album, titled X on 10 October 2017. In November 2017, Mo was a guest star on AOL live interview program BUILD Series and on MTV TRL in New York. The same month, she attended the 2017 American Music Awards. She next won the 2017 Mnet Asian Music Awards in Vietnam as Indonesia's Best Asian Artist. At the event, she performed "Coke Bottle", "Long As I Get Paid", and "Damn I Love You". On 13 December 2017, Mo announced that she was joining Chris Brown's Heartbreak on a Full Moon album deluxe edition with the song "On Purpose".

In March 2018, Mo was featured in Vogue USA. Mo herself was identified by the magazine as a breakout Indonesian pop star, songwriter, actress, producer and antidrug and antihuman trafficking activist. The following month, Mo joined the 300 Entertainment label. In July 2018, Mo released the single "Overdose" featuring Chris Brown. She was later featured on iHeartRadio's On The Verge Artist and perform live on iHeartRadio YouTube channel in October 2018. On 11 November 2018, Overdose entered five Billboard charts. The single reached 36th in R&B/HipHop Airplay, 38th in Rhythmic Songs, 24th in Hot R&B Songs, 28th in Mainstream R&B/HipHop ,and 30th in Mixshow Airplay. She was chosen as Artist of the Week on Billboard Vietnam on 16 November 2018.

Since 2019, Mo and Chris Brown have been preparing for their second joint project. She's also been working on a new album with Juicy J. On 14 March 2019, Mo won Social Star Award at the 2019 iHeartRadio Music Awards in Los Angeles. In August 2019, she appeared in Megan Thee Stallion's music video for "Hot Girl Summer". On 5 September 2019, Mo returned with her new single "Diamonds" featuring French Montana. On 22 October 2019, the music video for "Wanna Be Loved" was released.

Mo next had a collaboration with Steve Aoki and Desiigner in a new single "Girl", from Aoki's album Neon Future IV. The single was released on 25 March 2020, and topped Indonesian iTunes Top Songs.

In 2021, Agnez Mo worked together to launch an international graphic comic titled "Don't Wake Up" which is published by z2 Comic, headquartered in New York.

Artistry
Mo has been noted as a powerful soprano with a vocal range spanning 5 octaves (B2 - D6 - Bb6 - C#8). Her songs can be classified as pop. She has stated that Aretha Franklin, Madonna & Michael Jackson have influenced her music. Mo also drew inspirations from Britney Spears , Christina Aguilera, P!nk, Alicia Keys, Lauryn Hill, Brandy Norwood, Mariah Carey, Janet Jackson, Justin Timberlake, Nelly Furtado, Rihanna, Beyonce, Aaliyah, and TLC. In addition to her singing skills, Mo is also known as excellent dancer and actress. She is the only Indonesian soloist with a personal dance group, known as Nezindahood. They auditioned during the development of her first album in 2003. She has also written some of her songs and produced her own music videos. She has been described as a perfectionist with a variety of talents by music critics.

Throughout her career, Mo has often been deemed controversial in Indonesia. When she was a teenager, her frequent comments about her goal to break into the international market was viewed by some as a pompous proclamation. In 2010, however, she began working on a debut English studio album. Her slogan "Dream, Believe, and Make it Happen" was used in a 2011 cultural conference to inspire young people organized by the US Embassy in Jakarta.

Honors and awards

Mo has become the most-awarded Indonesian singer. Notable awards she has won included: 18 Anugerah Musik Indonesia, 8 Panasonic Awards, 5 Nickelodeon Indonesia Kids' Choice Awards, and 4 MTV Indonesia Awards. She has also received many international awards, including 1 Anugerah Planet Muzik, 3 Asia Song Festival, 7 JPopAsia Music Awards, 2 Mnet Asian Music Awards, 1 Shorty Awards, 3 Social Star Awards, 1 World Music Awards, and 1 iHeartRadio Music Awards. For her contribution and support to Indonesian music, Mo was honored the 2011 Nugraha Bhakti Musik Indonesia (NBMI) award from The Minister of Culture and Tourism, and Association of Indonesian Singers, Songwriters And Music Record Producers.

Personal life
During her career Mo has kept her personal life private and relationships private, often stating that dating is not her priority. She also stated that personal relationships of all public figures should remain private.

Discography

Studio albums
And the Story Goes (2003)
Whaddup A.. '?! (2005)
Sacredly Agnezious (2009)
AGNEZ MO (2013)
X (2017)

Filmography

TV series

Variety shows

References

Cited sources

External links

Living people
Anugerah Musik Indonesia winners
MAMA Award winners
English-language singers from Indonesia
Indonesian child singers
Indonesian Protestants
Indonesian people of Chinese descent
Indonesian dance musicians
Indonesian emigrants to the United States
21st-century Indonesian women singers
Indonesian female dancers
Indonesian pop singers
Indonesian rhythm and blues singers
Indonesian soul singers
Indonesian television actresses
People from Jakarta
20th-century Indonesian actresses
21st-century Indonesian actresses
Hakka musicians
1986 births
Indonesian sopranos
Women hip hop singers
Singers with a five-octave vocal range
Pelita Harapan University alumni